The Democratic Party  (PD) is a conservative political party in Argentina created in 1931. Founded as the National Democratic Party (PDN), it was generally known simply as Conservative Party.

Along with the Antipersonalist Radical Civic Union (UCR-A) and the Independent Socialist Party (PSI) it was a part of the Concordancia, a coalition government that ruled between 1932 and 1943, a period of Argentine history known as the "Infamous Decade", characterised by massive voter fraud.

Among its leading figures were Robustiano Patrón Costas, Julio Argentino Pascual Roca, Manuel Fresco and Rodolfo Moreno. Ramón S. Castillo, Vice-President to Roberto María Ortiz, who went to serve as acting President between 1940 and 1942, and later as President until June 4, 1943, was a member of this party.

After the "Revolución Libertadora" (1955–1958), the military uprising which overthrew Juan Perón, the PDN fragmented into various parties such as the Conservative People's Party (PCP), the Democratic Party and the Centrist Democratic Party.

Symbols

Flag

Notes

References

See also 
 Infamous Decade
 Agustín Pedro Justo
 Roberto María Ortiz
 Ramón S. Castillo

Infamous Decade
Defunct political parties in Argentina
Political parties established in 1931
1931 establishments in Argentina
Political parties established in 2019
2019 establishments in Argentina
Political parties disestablished in 1958
1958 disestablishments in Argentina